Protamine 2 is a protein that in humans is encoded by the PRM2 gene.

Function 

Protamines substitute for histones in the chromatin of sperm during the haploid phase of spermatogenesis, and are the major DNA-binding proteins in the nucleus of sperm in many vertebrates. They package the sperm DNA into a highly condensed complex in a volume less than 5% of a somatic cell nucleus. 

Many mammalian species have only one protamine (protamine 1); however, a few species, including human and mouse, have two. This gene encodes protamine 2, which is cleaved to give rise to a family of protamine 2 peptides. Alternatively spliced transcript variants have also been found for this gene. [provided by RefSeq, Sep 2015].

References

Further reading